Weston Ranch High School is a secondary school located in the Weston Ranch subdivision of Stockton, California. WRHS opened its doors in 2003. It is part of the Manteca Unified School District.

Demographics
According to 2021-22 demographics from the National Center of Education Statistics, The enrollment breakdown of Weston Ranch High School is as follows:

African American (not Hispanic) : 177
American Indian/Alaskan Native (not Hispanic): 2
Asian (not Hispanic) : 252
Hispanic/Latino of Any Race: 673
Native Hawaiian/Pacific Islander (not Hispanic): 23
Two or More Races (not Hispanic): 40
White (not Hispanic) : 70
Total : 1,237

Sports
Weston Ranch High School offers the following sports:

Baseball
Basketball (Boys and Girls)
Cross Country
Football
Golf (Boys and Girls)
Soccer (Boys and Girls)
Softball
Swimming 
Tennis (Boys and Girls)
Track and Field
Volleyball (Boys and Girls)
Water Polo
Wrestling

Varsity sports titles

Boys Basketball 
League

 Valley Oak League 
Titles (7): 2005-06, 2007–08, 2010–11, 2012–13, 2015–16, 2018–19, 2021-22

 San Joaquin Athletic Association
 Titles (1): 2022-23

Section

 Sac-Joaquin Section
Titles (2):  2015-16 (Div.3), 2018-19 (Div.3)

Regional

 Northern California
Titles (1):  2019-20 (Div.2)

Girls Basketball 
League

 San Joaquin Athletic Association 
Titles (1): 2022-23

Football 
League
 Valley Oak League
 Titles (1): 2005-06

Boys Soccer 
League

 Valley Oak League
 Titles (3): 2014-15, 2015–16, 2019–20

Section

 Sac-Joaquin Section
Titles (2):  2014-15 (Div.4), 2015-16 (Div.3)

Girls Tennis 

League

 Valley Oak League
 Titles (2): 2010-11, 2011–12

 San Joaquin Athletic Association
 Titles (1): 2022-23

Boys Volleyball 

League

 Valley Oak League
 Titles (1): 2018-19

Notable alumni

James Nunnally (born 1990), basketball player for Maccabi Tel Aviv of the Israeli Basketball Premier League and the Euroleague, formerly in the NBA

Notes

External links
 Official website

Educational institutions established in 2003
High schools in San Joaquin County, California
Public high schools in California
Manteca, California
2003 establishments in California